Giovanni Bettini (10 March 1938 – 10 February 2023) was an Italian architect and politician. A member of the Italian Communist Party, he served in the Chamber of Deputies from 1979 to 1983.

Bettini died in Sondrio on 10 February 2023, at the age of 84.

References

1938 births
2023 deaths
Deputies of Legislature VIII of Italy
Italian Communist Party politicians
Polytechnic University of Milan alumni
People from Sondrio